The 1934 United States House of Representatives elections were elections for the United States House of Representatives to elect members to serve in the 74th United States Congress. They were held for the most part on November 6, 1934, while Maine held theirs on September 10. They occurred in the middle of President Franklin D. Roosevelt's first term. The Democratic Party continued its progress, gaining another 9 net seats from the opposition Republican Party, who also lost seats to the Progressive Party. The Republicans were reduced below one-fourth of the chamber for the first time since the creation of the party.  The Wisconsin Progressive Party, a liberal group which allied with the Democrats, also became a force in Wisconsin politics.

The 1934 elections can be seen as a referendum on New Deal policies.  While conservatives and people among the middle class who did not bear the brunt of the depression saw New Deal programs as radical, lower-income voters overwhelmingly voted in this election cycle to continue the implementation of Roosevelt's agenda.  This marked the first time that an incumbent president's party did not lose seats in both houses in a midterm election, followed by 1998 and 2002.

Overall results

Source: Election Statistics - Office of the Clerk

Special elections 

There were three special elections in 1934 to the 73rd United States Congress.

Special elections are sorted by date then by district.

|-
! 
| Ernest Willard Gibson
|  | Republican
| 1923 
|  | Incumbent resigned October 19, 1933 to become U.S. senator.New member elected January 16, 1934.Republican hold.Successor seated January 18, 1934.Winner was subsequently re-elected in November.
| nowrap | 

|-
! 
| James S. Parker
|  | Republican
| 1912
|  | Incumbent died December 19, 1933.New member elected January 30, 1934. Republican hold.Successor seated February 5, 1934.Winner was subsequently re-elected in November.
| nowrap | 

|-
! 
| Edward W. Pou
|  | Democratic
| 1900
|  | Incumbent died April 1, 1934.New member elected July 7, 1934.Democratic hold.Successor was not seated until the next term.Winner was subsequently re-elected in November.
| nowrap | 

|}

Alabama 

|-
! 
| John McDuffie
|  | Democratic
| 1918
| Incumbent re-elected.
| nowrap | 

|-
! 
| J. Lister Hill
|  | Democratic
| 1923 
| Incumbent re-elected.
| nowrap | 

|-
! 
| Henry B. Steagall
|  | Democratic
| 1914
| Incumbent re-elected.
| nowrap | 

|-
! 
| Lamar Jeffers
|  | Democratic
| 1921 
|  | Incumbent lost renomination.New member elected.Democratic hold.
| nowrap | 

|-
! 
| Miles C. Allgood
|  | Democratic
| 1922
|  | Incumbent lost renomination.New member elected.Democratic hold.
| nowrap | 

|-
! 
| William B. Oliver
|  | Democratic
| 1914
| Incumbent re-elected.
| nowrap | 

|-
! 
| William B. Bankhead
|  | Democratic
| 1916
| Incumbent re-elected.
| nowrap | 

|-
! 
| Archibald Hill Carmichael
|  | Democratic
| 1933 
| Incumbent re-elected.
| nowrap | 

|-
! 
| George Huddleston
|  | Democratic
| 1914
| Incumbent re-elected.
| nowrap | 

|}

Arizona 

|-
! 
| Isabella Greenway
|  | Democratic
| 1933 
| Incumbent re-elected.
| nowrap | 

|}

Arkansas 

|-
! 
| William J. Driver
|  | Democratic
| 1920
| Incumbent re-elected.
| nowrap | 

|-
! 
| John E. Miller
|  | Democratic
| 1930
| Incumbent re-elected.
| nowrap | 

|-
! 
| Claude Fuller
|  | Democratic
| 1928
| Incumbent re-elected.
| nowrap | 

|-
! 
| Ben Cravens
|  | Democratic
| 1932
| Incumbent re-elected.
| nowrap | 

|-
! 
| David D. Terry
|  | Democratic
| 1933 
| Incumbent re-elected.
| nowrap | 

|-
! 
| David Delano Glover
|  | Democratic
| 1928
|  | Incumbent lost renomination.New member elected.Democratic hold.
| nowrap | 

|-
! 
| Tilman B. Parks
|  | Democratic
| 1920
| Incumbent re-elected.
| nowrap | 

|}

California 

|-
! 
| Clarence F. Lea
|  | Democratic
| 1916
| Incumbent re-elected.
| nowrap | 

|-
! 
| Harry Lane Englebright
|  | Republican
| 1926
| Incumbent re-elected.
| nowrap | 

|-
! 
| Frank H. Buck
|  | Democratic
| 1932
| Incumbent re-elected.
| nowrap | 

|-
! 
| Florence Prag Kahn
|  | Republican
| 1925 
| Incumbent re-elected.
| nowrap | 

|-
! 
| Richard J. Welch
|  | Republican
| 1926
| Incumbent re-elected.
| nowrap | 

|-
! 
| Albert E. Carter
|  | Republican
| 1924
| Incumbent re-elected.
| nowrap | 

|-
! 
| Ralph R. Eltse
|  | Republican
| 1932
|  | Incumbent lost re-election.New member elected.Democratic gain.
| nowrap | 

|-
! 
| John J. McGrath
|  | Democratic
| 1932
| Incumbent re-elected.
| nowrap | 

|-
! 
| Denver S. Church
|  | Democratic
| 1932
|  | Incumbent retired.New member elected.Republican gain.
| nowrap | 

|-
! 
| Henry E. Stubbs
|  | Democratic
| 1932
| Incumbent re-elected.
| nowrap | 

|-
! 
| William E. Evans
|  | Republican
| 1926
|  | Incumbent lost re-election.New member elected.Democratic gain.
| nowrap | 

|-
! 
| John H. Hoeppel
|  | Democratic
| 1932
| Incumbent re-elected.
| nowrap | 

|-
! 
| Charles Kramer
|  | Democratic
| 1932
| Incumbent re-elected.
| nowrap | 

|-
! 
| Thomas F. Ford
|  | Democratic
| 1932
| Incumbent re-elected.
| nowrap | 

|-
! 
| William I. Traeger
|  | Republican
| 1932
|  | Incumbent lost re-election.New member elected.Democratic gain.
| nowrap | 

|-
! 
| John F. Dockweiler
|  | Democratic
| 1932
| Incumbent re-elected.
| nowrap | 

|-
! 
| Charles J. Colden
|  | Democratic
| 1932
| Incumbent re-elected.
| nowrap | 

|-
! 
| John H. Burke
|  | Democratic
| 1932
|  | Incumbent retired.New member elected.Democratic hold.
| nowrap | 

|-
! 
| Sam L. Collins
|  | Republican
| 1932
| Incumbent re-elected.
| nowrap | 

|-
! 
| George Burnham
|  | Republican
| 1932
| Incumbent re-elected.
| nowrap | 

|}

Colorado 

|-
! 
| Lawrence Lewis
|  | Democratic
| 1932
| Incumbent re-elected.
| nowrap | 

|-
! 
| Fred Nelson Cummings
|  | Democratic
| 1932
| Incumbent re-elected.
| nowrap | 

|-
! 
| John Andrew Martin
|  | Democratic
| 1932
| Incumbent re-elected.
| nowrap | 

|-
! 
| Edward Thomas Taylor
|  | Democratic
| 1908
| Incumbent re-elected.
| nowrap | 

|}

Connecticut 

|-
! 
| Herman P. Kopplemann
|  | Democratic
| 1932
| Incumbent re-elected.
| nowrap | 

|-
! 
| William L. Higgins
|  | Republican
| 1932
| Incumbent re-elected.
| nowrap | 

|-
! 
| Francis T. Maloney
|  | Democratic
| 1932
|  | Retired to run for U.S. senator.New member elected.Democratic hold.
| nowrap | 

|-
! 
| Schuyler Merritt
|  | Republican
| 1932
| Incumbent re-elected.
| nowrap | 

|-
! 
| Edward W. Goss
|  | Republican
| 1930
|  | Incumbent lost re-election.New member elected.Democratic gain.
| nowrap | 

|-
! 
| Charles M. Bakewell
|  | Republican
| 1932
|  | Incumbent lost re-election.New member elected.Democratic gain.
| nowrap | 

|}

Delaware 

|-
! 
| Wilbur L. Adams
|  | Democratic
| 1932
|  | Retired to run for U. S. senator.New member elected.Republican gain.
| nowrap | 

|}

Florida 

|-
! 
| J. Hardin Peterson
|  | Democratic
| 1932
| Incumbent re-elected.
| nowrap | 

|-
! 
| Robert A. Green
|  | Democratic
| 1932
| Incumbent re-elected.
| nowrap | 

|-
! 
| Millard F. Caldwell
|  | Democratic
| 1932
| Incumbent re-elected.
| nowrap | 

|-
! 
| J. Mark Wilcox
|  | Democratic
| 1932
| Incumbent re-elected.
| nowrap | 

|-
! 
| William J. Sears
|  | Democratic
| 1932
| Incumbent re-elected.
| nowrap | 

|}

Georgia 

|-
! 
| Homer C. Parker
|  | Democratic
| 1931 
|  | Incumbent lost renomination.New member elected.Democratic hold.
| nowrap | 

|-
! 
| Edward E. Cox
|  | Democratic
| 1924
| Incumbent re-elected.
| nowrap | 

|-
! 
| Bryant T. Castellow
|  | Democratic
| 1932
| Incumbent re-elected.
| nowrap | 

|-
! 
| Emmett Marshall Owen
|  | Democratic
| 1932
| Incumbent re-elected.
| nowrap | 

|-
! 
| Robert Ramspeck
|  | Democratic
| 1929 
| Incumbent re-elected.
| nowrap | 

|-
! 
| Carl Vinson
|  | Democratic
| 1914
| Incumbent re-elected.
| nowrap | 

|-
! 
| Malcolm C. Tarver
|  | Democratic
| 1926
| Incumbent re-elected.
| nowrap | 

|-
! 
| Braswell Deen
|  | Democratic
| 1932
| Incumbent re-elected.
| nowrap | 

|-
! 
| John S. Wood
|  | Democratic
| 1930
|  | Incumbent lost renomination.New member elected.Democratic hold.
| nowrap | 

|-
! 
| Paul Brown
|  | Democratic
| 1933 
| Incumbent re-elected.
| nowrap | 

|}

Idaho 

|-
! 
| Compton I. White
|  | Democratic
| 1932
| Incumbent re-elected.
| nowrap | 

|-
! 
| Thomas C. Coffin
|  | Democratic
| 1932
|  | Incumbent died.New member elected.Democratic hold.
| nowrap | 

|}

Illinois 

|-
! 
| Oscar Stanton De Priest
|  | Republican
| 1928
|  | Incumbent lost re-election.New member elected.Democratic gain.
| nowrap | 

|-
! 
| P. H. Moynihan
|  | Republican
| 1932
|  | Incumbent lost re-election.New member elected.Democratic gain.
| nowrap | 

|-
! 
| Edward A. Kelly
|  | Democratic
| 1930
| Incumbent re-elected.
| nowrap | 

|-
! 
| Harry P. Beam
|  | Democratic
| 1930
| Incumbent re-elected.
| nowrap | 

|-
! 
| Adolph J. Sabath
|  | Democratic
| 1906
| Incumbent re-elected.
| nowrap | 

|-
! 
| Thomas J. O'Brien
|  | Democratic
| 1932
| Incumbent re-elected.
| nowrap | 

|-
! 
| Leonard W. Schuetz
|  | Democratic
| 1930
| Incumbent re-elected.
| nowrap | 

|-
! 
| Leo Kocialkowski
|  | Democratic
| 1932
| Incumbent re-elected.
| nowrap | 

|-
! 
| Frederick A. Britten
|  | Republican
| 1912
|  | Incumbent lost re-election.New member elected.Democratic gain.
| nowrap | 

|-
! 
| James Simpson Jr.
|  | Republican
| 1932
|  | Incumbent lost renomination.New member elected.Republican hold.
| nowrap | 

|-
! 
| Frank R. Reid
|  | Republican
| 1922
|  | Incumbent retired.New member elected.Republican hold.
| nowrap | 

|-
! 
| John T. Buckbee
|  | Republican
| 1926
| Incumbent re-elected.
| nowrap | 

|-
! 
| Leo E. Allen
|  | Republican
| 1932
| Incumbent re-elected.
| nowrap | 

|-
! 
| Chester Thompson
|  | Democratic
| 1932
| Incumbent re-elected.
| nowrap | 

|-
! 
| J. Leroy Adair
|  | Democratic
| 1932
| Incumbent re-elected.
| nowrap | 

|-
! 
| Everett Dirksen
|  | Republican
| 1932
| Incumbent re-elected.
| nowrap | 

|-
! 
| Frank Gillespie
|  | Democratic
| 1932
|  | Incumbent lost re-election.New member elected.Republican gain.
| nowrap | 

|-
! 
| James A. Meeks
|  | Democratic
| 1932
| Incumbent re-elected.
| nowrap | 

|-
! 
| Donald C. Dobbins
|  | Democratic
| 1932
| Incumbent re-elected.
| nowrap | 

|-
! 
| Henry T. Rainey
|  | Democratic
| 1922
|  | Incumbent died.New member elected.Democratic hold.
| nowrap | 

|-
! 
| J. Earl Major
|  | Democratic
| 1930
|  | Resigned October 6, 1933 to become U.S. District Judge.New member elected.Democratic hold.
| nowrap | 

|-
! 
| Edwin M. Schaefer
|  | Democratic
| 1932
| Incumbent re-elected.
| nowrap | 

|-
! 
| William W. Arnold
|  | Democratic
| 1922
| Incumbent re-elected.
| nowrap | 

|-
! 
| Claude V. Parsons
|  | Democratic
| 1930
| Incumbent re-elected.
| nowrap | 

|-
! 
| Kent E. Keller
|  | Democratic
| 1930
| Incumbent re-elected.
| nowrap | 

|-
! 
| Martin A. Brennan
|  | Democratic
| 1932
| Incumbent re-elected.
| rowspan=2 | 

|-
! 
| Walter Nesbit
|  | Democratic
| 1932
|  | Incumbent lost renomination.New member elected.Democratic hold.

|}

Indiana 

|-
! 
| William T. Schulte
|  | Democratic
| 1932
| Incumbent re-elected.
| nowrap | 

|-
! 
| George Durgan
|  | Democratic
| 1932
|  | Incumbent lost re-election.New member elected.Republican gain.
| nowrap | 

|-
! 
| Samuel B. Pettengill
|  | Democratic
| 1930
| Incumbent re-elected.
| nowrap | 

|-
! 
| James I. Farley
|  | Democratic
| 1932
| Incumbent re-elected.
| nowrap | 

|-
! 
| Glenn Griswold
|  | Democratic
| 1930
| Incumbent re-elected.
| nowrap | 

|-
! 
| Virginia Jenckes
|  | Democratic
| 1932
| Incumbent re-elected.
| nowrap | 

|-
! 
| Arthur H. Greenwood
|  | Democratic
| 1922
| Incumbent re-elected.
| nowrap | 

|-
! 
| John W. Boehne Jr.
|  | Democratic
| 1930
| Incumbent re-elected.
| nowrap | 

|-
! 
| Eugene B. Crowe
|  | Democratic
| 1930
| Incumbent re-elected.
| nowrap | 

|-
! 
| Finly Hutchinson Gray
|  | Democratic
| 1932
| Incumbent re-elected.
| nowrap | 

|-
! 
| William H. Larrabee
|  | Democratic
| 1930
| Incumbent re-elected.
| nowrap | 

|-
! 
| Louis Ludlow
|  | Democratic
| 1928
| Incumbent re-elected.
| nowrap | 

|}

Iowa 

|-
! 
| Edward C. Eicher
|  | Democratic
| 1932
| Incumbent re-elected.
| nowrap | 

|-
! 
| Bernhard M. Jacobsen
|  | Democratic
| 1930
| Incumbent re-elected.
| nowrap | 

|-
! 
| Albert C. Willford
|  | Democratic
| 1932
|  | Incumbent lost re-election.New member elected.Republican gain.
| nowrap | 

|-
! 
| Fred Bierman
|  | Democratic
| 1932
| Incumbent re-elected.
| nowrap | 

|-
! 
| Lloyd Thurston
|  | Republican
| 1924
| Incumbent re-elected.
| nowrap | 

|-
! 
| Cassius C. Dowell
|  | Republican
| 1914
|  | Incumbent lost re-election.New member elected.Democratic gain.
| nowrap | 

|-
! 
| Otha D. Wearin
|  | Democratic
| 1932
| Incumbent re-elected.
| nowrap | 

|-
! 
| Fred C. Gilchrist
|  | Republican
| 1930
| Incumbent re-elected.
| nowrap | 

|-
! 
| Guy M. Gillette
|  | Democratic
| 1932
| Incumbent re-elected.
| nowrap | 

|}

Kansas 

|-
! 
| William P. Lambertson
|  | Republican
| 1928
| Incumbent re-elected.
| nowrap | 

|-
! 
| Ulysses Samuel Guyer
|  | Republican
| 1926
| Incumbent re-elected.
| nowrap | 

|-
! 
| Harold C. McGugin
|  | Republican
| 1930
|  | Incumbent lost re-election.New member elected.Democratic gain.
| nowrap | 

|-
! 
| Randolph Carpenter
|  | Democratic
| 1932
| Incumbent re-elected.
| nowrap | 

|-
! 
| William Augustus Ayres
|  | Democratic
| 1922
|  | Resigned when appointed to Federal Trade CommissionDemocratic hold.
| nowrap | 

|-
! 
| Kathryn O'Loughlin McCarthy
|  | Democratic
| 1932
|  | Incumbent lost re-election.New member elected.Republican gain.
| nowrap | 

|-
! 
| Clifford R. Hope
|  | Republican
| 1926
| Incumbent re-elected.
| nowrap | 

|}

Kentucky 

|-
! 
| William Voris Gregory
|  | Democratic
| 1926
| Incumbent re-elected.
| nowrap | 

|-
! 
| Glover H. Cary
|  | Democratic
| 1930
| Incumbent re-elected.
| nowrap | 

|-
! 
| John Y. Brown Sr.
|  | Democratic
| 1932
|  | Incumbent lost renomination.New member elected.Democratic hold.
| nowrap | 

|-
! 
| Cap R. Carden
|  | Democratic
| 1930
| Incumbent re-elected.
| nowrap | 

|-
! 
| Brent Spence
|  | Democratic
| 1930
| Incumbent re-elected.
| nowrap | 

|-
! 
| Virgil Chapman
|  | Democratic
| 1930
| Incumbent re-elected.
| nowrap | 

|-
! 
| Andrew J. May
|  | Democratic
| 1930
| Incumbent re-elected.
| nowrap | 

|-
! 
| Fred M. Vinson
|  | Democratic
| 1930
| Incumbent re-elected.
| nowrap | 

|-
! 
| Finley Hamilton
|  | Democratic
| 1932
|  | Incumbent retired.New member elected.Republican gain.
| nowrap | 

|}

Louisiana 

|-
! 
| Joachim O. Fernandez
|  | Democratic
| 1930
| Incumbent re-elected.
| nowrap | 

|-
! 
| Paul H. Maloney
|  | Democratic
| 1930
| Incumbent re-elected.
| nowrap | 

|-
! 
| Numa F. Montet
|  | Democratic
| 1929 
| Incumbent re-elected.
| nowrap | 

|-
! 
| John N. Sandlin
|  | Democratic
| 1920
| Incumbent re-elected.
| nowrap | 

|-
! 
| Riley Joseph Wilson
|  | Democratic
| 1914
| Incumbent re-elected.
| nowrap | 

|-
! 
| Jared Y. Sanders Jr.
|  | Democratic
| 1934
| Incumbent re-elected.
| nowrap | 

|-
! 
| René L. De Rouen
|  | Democratic
| 1927 
| Incumbent re-elected.
| nowrap | 

|-
! 
| Cleveland Dear
|  | Democratic
| 1932
| Incumbent re-elected.
| nowrap | 

|}

Maine 

|-
! 
| Carroll L. Beedy
|  | Republican
| 1920
|  | Incumbent lost re-election.New member elected.Democratic gain.
| nowrap | 

|-
! 
| Edward C. Moran Jr.
|  | Democratic
| 1932
| Incumbent re-elected.
| nowrap | 

|-
! 
| John G. Utterback
|  | Democratic
| 1932
|  | Incumbent lost re-election.New member elected.Republican gain.
| nowrap | 

|}

Maryland 

|-
! 
| T. Alan Goldsborough
|  | Democratic
| 1920
| Incumbent re-elected.
| nowrap | 

|-
! 
| William P. Cole Jr.
|  | Democratic
| 1930
| Incumbent re-elected.
| nowrap | 

|-
! 
| Vincent Luke Palmisano
|  | Democratic
| 1926
| Incumbent re-elected.
| nowrap | 

|-
! 
| Ambrose Jerome Kennedy
|  | Democratic
| 1932
| Incumbent re-elected.
| nowrap | 

|-
! 
| Stephen W. Gambrill
|  | Democratic
| 1924
| Incumbent re-elected.
| nowrap | 

|-
! 
| David J. Lewis
|  | Democratic
| 1930
| Incumbent re-elected.
| nowrap | 

|}

Massachusetts 

|-
! 
| Allen T. Treadway
|  | Republican
| 1912
| Incumbent re-elected.
| nowrap | 

|-
! 
| William J. Granfield
|  | Democratic
| 1930
| Incumbent re-elected.
| nowrap | 

|-
! 
| Frank H. Foss
|  | Republican
| 1924
|  | Incumbent lost re-election.New member elected.Democratic gain.
| nowrap | 

|-
! 
| Pehr G. Holmes
|  | Republican
| 1930
| Incumbent re-elected.
| nowrap | 

|-
! 
| Edith Nourse Rogers
|  | Republican
| 1925 
| Incumbent re-elected.
| nowrap | 

|-
! 
| Abram Andrew
|  | Republican
| 1921 
| Incumbent re-elected.
| nowrap | 

|-
! 
| William P. Connery Jr.
|  | Democratic
| 1922
| Incumbent re-elected.
| nowrap | 

|-
! 
| Arthur D. Healey
|  | Democratic
| 1932
| Incumbent re-elected.
| nowrap | 

|-
! 
| Robert Luce
|  | Republican
| 1918
|  | Incumbent lost re-election.New member elected.Democratic gain.
| nowrap | 

|-
! 
| George H. Tinkham
|  | Republican
| 1914
| Incumbent re-elected.
| nowrap | 

|-
! 
| John J. Douglass
|  | Democratic
| 1924
|  | Incumbent lost renomination.New member elected.Democratic hold.
| nowrap | 

|-
! 
| John William McCormack
|  | Democratic
| 1928
| Incumbent re-elected.
| nowrap | 

|-
! 
| Richard B. Wigglesworth
|  | Republican
| 1928
| Incumbent re-elected.
| nowrap | 

|-
! 
| Joseph William Martin Jr.
|  | Republican
| 1924
| Incumbent re-elected.
| nowrap | 

|-
! 
| Charles L. Gifford
|  | Republican
| 1922
| Incumbent re-elected.
| nowrap | 

|}

Michigan 

|-
! 
| George G. Sadowski
|  | Democratic
| 1932
| Incumbent re-elected.
| nowrap | 

|-
! 
| John C. Lehr
|  | Democratic
| 1932
|  | Incumbent lost re-election.New member elected.Republican gain.
| nowrap | 

|-
! 
| Joseph L. Hooper
|  | Republican
| 1925 
|  | Incumbent died.New member elected.Republican hold.
| nowrap | 

|-
! 
| George Ernest Foulkes
|  | Democratic
| 1932
|  | Incumbent lost re-election.New member elected.Republican gain.
| nowrap | 

|-
! 
| Carl E. Mapes
|  | Republican
| 1912
| Incumbent re-elected.
| nowrap | 

|-
! 
| Claude E. Cady
|  | Democratic
| 1932
|  | Incumbent lost re-election.New member elected.Republican gain.
| nowrap | 

|-
! 
| Jesse P. Wolcott
|  | Republican
| 1930
| Incumbent re-elected.
| nowrap | 

|-
! 
| Michael J. Hart
|  | Democratic
| 1931 
|  | Incumbent lost re-election.New member elected.Republican gain.
| nowrap | 

|-
! 
| Harry W. Musselwhite
|  | Democratic
| 1932
|  | Incumbent lost re-election.New member elected.Republican gain.
| nowrap | 

|-
! 
| Roy O. Woodruff
|  | Republican
| 1920
| Incumbent re-elected.
| nowrap | 

|-
! 
| Prentiss M. Brown
|  | Democratic
| 1932
| Incumbent re-elected.
| nowrap | 

|-
! 
| W. Frank James
|  | Republican
| 1914
|  | Incumbent lost re-election.New member elected.Democratic gain.
| nowrap | 

|-
! 
| Clarence J. McLeod
|  | Republican
| 1922
| Incumbent re-elected.
| nowrap | 

|-
! 
| Carl M. Weideman
|  | Democratic
| 1932
|  | Incumbent lost renomination.New member elected.Democratic hold.
| nowrap | 

|-
! 
| John D. Dingell Sr.
|  | Democratic
| 1932
| Incumbent re-elected.
| nowrap | 

|-
! 
| John Lesinski Sr.
|  | Democratic
| 1932
| Incumbent re-elected.
| nowrap | 

|-
! 
| George A. Dondero
|  | Republican
| 1932
| Incumbent re-elected.
| nowrap | 

|}

Minnesota 

|-
! 
| colspan=3 | None (District created)
|  | New seatRepublican gain.
| nowrap | 

|-
! 
| Henry M. Arens
|  | Farmer–Labor
| 1932
|  | Incumbent lost re-election.New member elected.Democratic gain.
| nowrap | 

|-
! 
| Ernest Lundeen
|  | Farmer–Labor
| 1932
| Incumbent re-elected.
| nowrap | 

|-
! 
| Einar Hoidale
|  | Democratic
| 1932
|  | Retired to run for U.S. senator.New member elected.Republican gain.
| nowrap | 

|-
! rowspan=2 | 
| Theodore Christianson
|  | Republican
| 1932
| Incumbent re-elected.
| rowspan=2 | 

|-
| Ray P. Chase
|  | Republican
| 1932
|  | Incumbent lost renomination.New member elected.Republican loss

|-
! rowspan=2 | 
| Harold Knutson
|  | Republican
| 1916
| Incumbent re-elected.
| rowspan=2 | 

|-
| Magnus Johnson
|  | Farmer–Labor
| 1932
|  | Incumbent lost re-election.New member elected.Farmer–Labor loss

|-
! 
| Paul John Kvale
|  | Farmer–Labor
| 1929 
| Incumbent re-elected.
| nowrap | 

|-
! 
| Francis H. Shoemaker
|  | Farmer–Labor
| 1932
|  | Lost re-election as independentRepublican gain.
| nowrap | 

|-
! 
| colspan=3 | None (District created)
|  | New seatFarmer–Labor gain.
| nowrap | 

|}

Mississippi 

|-
! 
| John E. Rankin
|  | Democratic
| 1920
| Incumbent re-elected.
| nowrap | 

|-
! 
| Wall Doxey
|  | Democratic
| 1928
| Incumbent re-elected.
| nowrap | 

|-
! 
| William Madison Whittington
|  | Democratic
| 1924
| Incumbent re-elected.
| nowrap | 

|-
! 
| Jeff Busby
|  | Democratic
| 1922
|  | Incumbent lost renomination.New member elected.Democratic hold.
| nowrap | 

|-
! 
| Ross A. Collins
|  | Democratic
| 1920
|  | Retired to run for U.S. senator.New member elected.Democratic hold.
| nowrap | 

|-
! 
| William M. Colmer
|  | Democratic
| 1932
| Incumbent re-elected.
| nowrap | 

|-
! 
| Lawrence Russell Ellzey
|  | Democratic
| 1932
|  | Incumbent lost renomination.New member elected.Democratic hold.
| nowrap | 

|}

Missouri 

|-
! 
| Milton A. Romjue
|  | Democratic
| 1922
| Incumbent re-elected.
| nowrap | 

|-
! 
| Ralph F. Lozier
|  | Democratic
| 1922
|  | Incumbent lost renomination.New member elected.Democratic hold.
| nowrap | 

|-
! rowspan=2 | 
| Richard M. Duncan
|  | Democratic
| 1932
| Incumbent re-elected.
| rowspan=2 | 

|-
| Jacob L. Milligan
|  | Democratic
| 1922
|  | Retired to run for U.S. senator.New member elected.Democratic loss

|-
! 
| colspan=3 | None (District created)
|  | New seatDemocratic gain.
| nowrap | 

|-
! 
| Joe Shannon
|  | Democratic
| 1930
| Incumbent re-elected.
| nowrap | 

|-
! rowspan=3 | 
| Reuben T. Wood
|  | Democratic
| 1932
| Incumbent re-elected.
| rowspan=3 | 

|-
| Clement C. Dickinson
|  | Democratic
| 1930
|  | Incumbent lost renomination.New member elected.Democratic loss

|-
| James Edward Ruffin
|  | Democratic
| 1932
|  | Incumbent lost renomination.New member elected.Democratic loss

|-
! 
| Frank H. Lee
|  | Democratic
| 1932
|  | Incumbent lost re-election.New member elected.Republican gain.
| nowrap | 

|-
! 
| Clyde Williams
|  | Democratic
| 1930
| Incumbent re-elected.
| nowrap | 

|-
! 
| Clarence Cannon
|  | Democratic
| 1922
| Incumbent re-elected.
| nowrap | 

|-
! 
| colspan=3 | None (District created)
|  | New seatDemocratic gain.
| nowrap | 

|-
! 
| colspan=3 | None (District created)
|  | New seatDemocratic gain.
| nowrap | 

|-
! 
| James Robert Claiborne
|  | Democratic
| 1932
| Incumbent re-elected.
| nowrap | 

|-
! 
| John J. Cochran
|  | Democratic
| 1926
| Incumbent re-elected.
| nowrap | 

|}

Montana 

|-
! 
| Joseph P. Monaghan
|  | Democratic
| 1932
| Incumbent re-elected.
| nowrap | 

|-
! 
| Roy E. Ayers
|  | Democratic
| 1932
| Incumbent re-elected.
| nowrap | 

|}

Nebraska 

|-
! 
| John H. Morehead
|  | Democratic
| 1922
|  | Incumbent retired.New member elected.Democratic hold.
| nowrap | 

|-
! 
| Edward R. Burke
|  | Democratic
| 1932
|  | Retired to run for U.S. senator.New member elected.Democratic hold.
| nowrap | 

|-
! 
| Edgar Howard
|  | Democratic
| 1922
|  | Incumbent lost re-election.New member elected.Republican gain.
| nowrap | 

|-
! 
| Ashton C. Shallenberger
|  | Democratic
| 1930
|  | Incumbent lost renomination.New member elected.Democratic hold.
| nowrap | 

|-
! 
| Terry Carpenter
|  | Democratic
| 1932
|  | Retired to run for Governor of Nebraska.New member elected.Democratic hold.
| nowrap | 

|}

Nevada 

|-
! 
| James G. Scrugham
|  | Democratic
| 1932
| Incumbent re-elected.
| nowrap | 

|}

New Hampshire 

|-
! 
| William Nathaniel Rogers
|  | Democratic
| 1932
| Incumbent re-elected.
| nowrap | 

|-
! 
| Charles W. Tobey
|  | Republican
| 1932
| Incumbent re-elected.
| nowrap | 

|}

New Jersey 

|-
! 
| Charles A. Wolverton
|  | Republican
| 1926
| Incumbent re-elected.
| nowrap | 

|-
! 
| Isaac Bacharach
|  | Republican
| 1914
| Incumbent re-elected.
| nowrap | 

|-
! 
| William H. Sutphin
|  | Democratic
| 1930
| Incumbent re-elected.
| nowrap | 

|-
! 
| D. Lane Powers
|  | Republican
| 1932
| Incumbent re-elected.
| nowrap | 

|-
! 
| Charles A. Eaton
|  | Republican
| 1924
| Incumbent re-elected.
| nowrap | 

|-
! 
| Donald H. McLean
|  | Republican
| 1932
| Incumbent re-elected.
| nowrap | 

|-
! 
| Randolph Perkins
|  | Republican
| 1920
| Incumbent re-elected.
| nowrap | 

|-
! 
| George N. Seger
|  | Republican
| 1922
| Incumbent re-elected.
| nowrap | 

|-
! 
| Edward A. Kenney
|  | Democratic
| 1932
| Incumbent re-elected.
| nowrap | 

|-
! 
| Fred A. Hartley Jr.
|  | Republican
| 1928
| Incumbent re-elected.
| nowrap | 

|-
! 
| Peter Angelo Cavicchia
|  | Republican
| 1930
| Incumbent re-elected.
| nowrap | 

|-
! 
| Frederick R. Lehlbach
|  | Republican
| 1914
| Incumbent re-elected.
| nowrap | 

|-
! 
| Mary Teresa Norton
|  | Democratic
| 1924
| Incumbent re-elected.
| nowrap | 

|-
! 
| Oscar L. Auf der Heide
|  | Democratic
| 1924
|  | Incumbent retired.New member elected.Democratic hold.
| nowrap | 

|}

New Mexico 

|-
! 
| Dennis Chavez
|  | Democratic
| 1930
|  | Retired to run for U.S. senator.New member elected.Democratic hold.
| nowrap | 

|}

New York 

|-
! 
| Robert L. Bacon
|  | Republican
| 1922
| Incumbent re-elected.
| nowrap | 

|-
! 
| William F. Brunner
|  | Democratic
| 1928
| Incumbent re-elected.
| nowrap | 

|-
! 
| George W. Lindsay
|  | Democratic
| 1922
|  | Incumbent lost renomination.New member elected.Democratic hold.
| nowrap | 

|-
! 
| Thomas H. Cullen
|  | Democratic
| 1918
| Incumbent re-elected.
| nowrap | 

|-
! 
| Loring M. Black Jr.
|  | Democratic
| 1922
|  | Incumbent retired.New member elected.Democratic hold.
| nowrap | 

|-
! 
| Andrew Lawrence Somers
|  | Democratic
| 1924
| Incumbent re-elected.
| nowrap | 

|-
! 
| John J. Delaney
|  | Democratic
| 1931 
| Incumbent re-elected.
| nowrap | 

|-
! 
| Patrick J. Carley
|  | Democratic
| 1926
|  | Incumbent retired.New member elected.Democratic hold.
| nowrap | 

|-
! 
| Stephen A. Rudd
|  | Democratic
| 1931 
| Incumbent re-elected.
| nowrap | 

|-
! 
| Emanuel Celler
|  | Democratic
| 1922
| Incumbent re-elected.
| nowrap | 

|-
! 
| Anning S. Prall
|  | Democratic
| 1923 
|  | Incumbent retired.New member elected.Democratic hold.
| nowrap | 

|-
! 
| Samuel Dickstein
|  | Democratic
| 1922
| Incumbent re-elected.
| nowrap | 

|-
! 
| Christopher D. Sullivan
|  | Democratic
| 1916
| Incumbent re-elected.
| nowrap | 

|-
! 
| William Irving Sirovich
|  | Democratic
| 1926
| Incumbent re-elected.
| nowrap | 

|-
! 
| John J. Boylan
|  | Democratic
| 1922
| Incumbent re-elected.
| nowrap | 

|-
! 
| John J. O'Connor
|  | Democratic
| 1923 
| Incumbent re-elected.
| nowrap | 

|-
! 
| Theodore A. Peyser
|  | Democratic
| 1932
| Incumbent re-elected.
| nowrap | 

|-
! 
| Martin J. Kennedy
|  | Democratic
| 1930
| Incumbent re-elected.
| nowrap | 

|-
! 
| Sol Bloom
|  | Democratic
| 1923 
| Incumbent re-elected.
| nowrap | 

|-
! 
| James J. Lanzetta
|  | Democratic
| 1932
|  | Incumbent lost re-election.New member elected.Republican gain.
| nowrap | 

|-
! 
| Joseph A. Gavagan
|  | Democratic
| 1929 
| Incumbent re-elected.
| nowrap | 

|-
! 
| Anthony J. Griffin
|  | Democratic
| 1918
| Incumbent re-elected.
| nowrap | 

|-
! 
| Frank A. Oliver
|  | Democratic
| 1922
|  | Resigned when appointed justiceDemocratic hold.
| nowrap | 

|-
! 
| James M. Fitzpatrick
|  | Democratic
| 1926
| Incumbent re-elected.
| nowrap | 

|-
! 
| Charles D. Millard
|  | Republican
| 1930
| Incumbent re-elected.
| nowrap | 

|-
! 
| Hamilton Fish III
|  | Republican
| 1920
| Incumbent re-elected.
| nowrap | 

|-
! 
| Philip A. Goodwin
|  | Republican
| 1932
| Incumbent re-elected.
| nowrap | 

|-
! 
| Parker Corning
|  | Democratic
| 1922
| Incumbent re-elected.
| nowrap | 

|-
! 
| William D. Thomas
|  | Republican
| 1934 
| Incumbent re-elected.
| nowrap | 

|-
! 
| Frank Crowther
|  | Republican
| 1918
| Incumbent re-elected.
| nowrap | 

|-
! 
| Bertrand Snell
|  | Republican
| 1915 
| Incumbent re-elected.
| nowrap | 

|-
! 
| Francis D. Culkin
|  | Republican
| 1928
| Incumbent re-elected.
| nowrap | 

|-
! 
| Fred J. Sisson
|  | Democratic
| 1932
| Incumbent re-elected.
| nowrap | 

|-
! 
| Marian W. Clarke
|  | Republican
| 1933 
|  | Incumbent retired.New member elected.Republican hold.
| nowrap | 

|-
! 
| Clarence E. Hancock
|  | Republican
| 1927 
| Incumbent re-elected.
| nowrap | 

|-
! 
| John Taber
|  | Republican
| 1922
| Incumbent re-elected.
| nowrap | 

|-
! 
| Gale H. Stalker
|  | Republican
| 1922
|  | Incumbent retired.New member elected.Republican hold.
| nowrap | 

|-
! 
| James L. Whitley
|  | Republican
| 1928
|  | Incumbent lost re-election.New member elected.Democratic gain.
| nowrap | 

|-
! 
| James Wolcott Wadsworth Jr.
|  | Republican
| 1932
| Incumbent re-elected.
| nowrap | 

|-
! 
| Walter Gresham Andrews
|  | Republican
| 1930
| Incumbent re-elected.
| nowrap | 

|-
! 
| Alfred F. Beiter
|  | Democratic
| 1932
| Incumbent re-elected.
| nowrap | 

|-
! 
| James M. Mead
|  | Democratic
| 1918
| Incumbent re-elected.
| nowrap | 

|-
! 
| Daniel A. Reed
|  | Republican
| 1918
| Incumbent re-elected.
| nowrap | 

|-
! Seat A
| Elmer E. Studley
|  | Democratic
| 1932
|  | Incumbent retired.New member elected.Democratic hold.
| rowspan=2 | 

|-
! Seat B
| John Fitzgibbons
|  | Democratic
| 1932
|  | Incumbent retired.New member elected.Democratic hold.

|}

North Carolina 

|-
! 
| Lindsay C. Warren
|  | Democratic
| 1924
| Incumbent re-elected.
| nowrap | 

|-
! 
| John H. Kerr
|  | Democratic
| 1923 
| Incumbent re-elected.
| nowrap | 

|-
! 
| Charles L. Abernethy
|  | Democratic
| 1922
|  | Incumbent lost renomination.New member elected.Democratic hold.
| nowrap | 

|-
! 
| Harold D. Cooley
|  | Democratic
| 1934 
| Incumbent re-elected.
| nowrap | 

|-
! 
| Franklin Wills Hancock Jr.
|  | Democratic
| 1930
| Incumbent re-elected.
| nowrap | 

|-
! 
| William B. Umstead
|  | Democratic
| 1932
| Incumbent re-elected.
| nowrap | 

|-
! 
| J. Bayard Clark
|  | Democratic
| 1928
| Incumbent re-elected.
| nowrap | 

|-
! 
| Walter Lambeth
|  | Democratic
| 1930
| Incumbent re-elected.
| nowrap | 

|-
! 
| Robert L. Doughton
|  | Democratic
| 1910
| Incumbent re-elected.
| nowrap | 

|-
! 
| Alfred L. Bulwinkle
|  | Democratic
| 1930
| Incumbent re-elected.
| nowrap | 

|-
! 
| Zebulon Weaver
|  | Democratic
| 1930
| Incumbent re-elected.
| nowrap | 

|}

North Dakota 

|-
! rowspan=2 | 
| William Lemke
|  | Republican
| 1932
| Incumbent re-elected.
| rowspan=2 | 

|-
| James H. Sinclair
|  | Republican
| 1918
|  | Incumbent lost renomination.New member elected.Republican hold.

|}

Ohio 

|-
! 
| John B. Hollister
|  | Republican
| 1931 
| Incumbent re-elected.
| nowrap | 

|-
! 
| William E. Hess
|  | Republican
| 1928
| Incumbent re-elected.
| nowrap | 

|-
! 
| Byron B. Harlan
|  | Democratic
| 1930
| Incumbent re-elected.
| nowrap | 

|-
! 
| Frank L. Kloeb
|  | Democratic
| 1932
| Incumbent re-elected.
| nowrap | 

|-
! 
| Frank C. Kniffin
|  | Democratic
| 1930
| Incumbent re-elected.
| nowrap | 

|-
! 
| James G. Polk
|  | Democratic
| 1930
| Incumbent re-elected.
| nowrap | 

|-
! 
| Leroy T. Marshall
|  | Republican
| 1932
| Incumbent re-elected.
| nowrap | 

|-
! 
| Thomas B. Fletcher
|  | Democratic
| 1932
| Incumbent re-elected.
| nowrap | 

|-
! 
| Warren J. Duffey
|  | Democratic
| 1932
| Incumbent re-elected.
| nowrap | 

|-
! 
| Thomas A. Jenkins
|  | Republican
| 1924
| Incumbent re-elected.
| nowrap | 

|-
! 
| Mell G. Underwood
|  | Democratic
| 1922
| Incumbent re-elected.
| nowrap | 

|-
! 
| Arthur P. Lamneck
|  | Democratic
| 1930
| Incumbent re-elected.
| nowrap | 

|-
! 
| William L. Fiesinger
|  | Democratic
| 1930
| Incumbent re-elected.
| nowrap | 

|-
! 
| Dow W. Harter
|  | Democratic
| 1932
| Incumbent re-elected.
| nowrap | 

|-
! 
| Robert T. Secrest
|  | Democratic
| 1932
| Incumbent re-elected.
| nowrap | 

|-
! 
| William R. Thom
|  | Democratic
| 1932
| Incumbent re-elected.
| nowrap | 

|-
! 
| Charles F. West
|  | Democratic
| 1930
|  | Retired to run for U.S. senator.New member elected.Democratic hold.
| nowrap | 

|-
! 
| Lawrence E. Imhoff
|  | Democratic
| 1932
| Incumbent re-elected.
| nowrap | 

|-
! 
| John G. Cooper
|  | Republican
| 1914
| Incumbent re-elected.
| nowrap | 

|-
! 
| Martin L. Sweeney
|  | Democratic
| 1931 
| Incumbent re-elected.
| nowrap | 

|-
! 
| Robert Crosser
|  | Democratic
| 1922
| Incumbent re-elected.
| nowrap | 

|-
! 
| Chester C. Bolton
|  | Republican
| 1928
| Incumbent re-elected.
| nowrap | 

|-
! 
| Charles V. Truax
|  | Democratic
| 1932
| Incumbent re-elected.
| rowspan=2 | 

|-
! 
| Stephen M. Young
|  | Democratic
| 1932
| Incumbent re-elected.

|}

Oklahoma 

|-
! 
| Wesley E. Disney
|  | Democratic
| 1930
| Incumbent re-elected.
| nowrap | 

|-
! 
| William Wirt Hastings
|  | Democratic
| 1922
|  | Incumbent retired.New member elected.Democratic hold.
| nowrap | 

|-
! 
| Wilburn Cartwright
|  | Democratic
| 1926
| Incumbent re-elected.
| nowrap | 

|-
! 
| Tom D. McKeown
|  | Democratic
| 1922
|  | Incumbent lost renomination.New member elected.Democratic hold.
| nowrap | 

|-
! 
| Fletcher B. Swank
|  | Democratic
| 1930
|  | Incumbent lost renomination.New member elected.Democratic hold.
| nowrap | 

|-
! 
| Jed Johnson
|  | Democratic
| 1926
| Incumbent re-elected.
| nowrap | 

|-
! 
| James V. McClintic
|  | Democratic
| 1914
|  | Incumbent lost renomination.New member elected.Democratic hold.
| nowrap | 

|-
! 
| Ernest W. Marland
|  | Democratic
| 1932
|  | Retired to run for Governor of Oklahoma.New member elected.Democratic hold.
| nowrap | 

|-
! 
| Will Rogers
|  | Democratic
| 1932
| Incumbent re-elected.
| nowrap | 

|}

Oregon 

|-
! 
| James W. Mott
|  | Republican
| 1932
| Incumbent re-elected.
| nowrap | 

|-
! 
| Walter M. Pierce
|  | Democratic
| 1932
| Incumbent re-elected.
| nowrap | 

|-
! 
| Charles H. Martin
|  | Democratic
| 1930
|  | Retired to run for Governor of Oregon.New member elected.Republican gain.
| nowrap | 

|}

Pennsylvania 

|-
! 
| Harry C. Ransley
|  | Republican
| 1920
| Incumbent re-elected.
| nowrap | 

|-
! 
| James M. Beck
|  | Republican
| 1927 
|  | Incumbent resigned.New member elected.Republican hold.
| nowrap | 

|-
! 
| Alfred M. Waldron
|  | Republican
| 1932
|  | Incumbent retired.New member elected.Republican hold.
| nowrap | 

|-
! 
| George W. Edmonds
|  | Republican
| 1932
|  | Incumbent lost re-election.New member elected.Democratic gain.
| nowrap | 

|-
! 
| James J. Connolly
|  | Republican
| 1920
|  | Incumbent lost re-election.New member elected.Democratic gain.
| nowrap | 

|-
! 
| Edward L. Stokes
|  | Republican
| 1931 
|  | Retired to run for Governor of Pennsylvania.New member elected.Democratic gain.
| nowrap | 

|-
! 
| George P. Darrow
|  | Republican
| 1914
| Incumbent re-elected.
| nowrap | 

|-
! 
| James Wolfenden
|  | Republican
| 1928
| Incumbent re-elected.
| nowrap | 

|-
! 
| Oliver W. Frey
|  | Democratic
| 1933 
| Incumbent re-elected.
| nowrap | 

|-
! 
| J. Roland Kinzer
|  | Republican
| 1930
| Incumbent re-elected.
| nowrap | 

|-
! 
| Patrick J. Boland
|  | Democratic
| 1930
| Incumbent re-elected.
| nowrap | 

|-
! 
| Charles Murray Turpin
|  | Republican
| 1929 
| Incumbent re-elected.
| nowrap | 

|-
! 
| George F. Brumm
|  | Republican
| 1928
|  | Incumbent died.New member elected.Democratic gain.
| nowrap | 

|-
! 
| William Emanuel Richardson
|  | Democratic
| 1932
| Incumbent re-elected.
| nowrap | 

|-
! 
| Louis T. McFadden
|  | Republican
| 1914
|  | Incumbent lost re-election.New member elected.Democratic gain.
| nowrap | 

|-
! 
| Robert F. Rich
|  | Republican
| 1930
| Incumbent re-elected.
| nowrap | 

|-
! 
| J. William Ditter
|  | Republican
| 1932
| Incumbent re-elected.
| nowrap | 

|-
! 
| Benjamin K. Focht
|  | Republican
| 1932
| Incumbent re-elected.
| nowrap | 

|-
! 
| Isaac Hoffer Doutrich
|  | Republican
| 1926
| Incumbent re-elected.
| nowrap | 

|-
! 
| Thomas Cunningham Cochran
|  | Republican
| 1926
|  | Incumbent retired.New member elected.Democratic gain.
| nowrap | 

|-
! 
| Francis E. Walter
|  | Democratic
| 1932
| Incumbent re-elected.
| nowrap | 

|-
! 
| Harry L. Haines
|  | Democratic
| 1930
| Incumbent re-elected.
| nowrap | 

|-
! 
| J. Banks Kurtz
|  | Republican
| 1922
|  | Incumbent lost re-election.New member elected.Democratic gain.
| nowrap | 

|-
! 
| J. Buell Snyder
|  | Democratic
| 1932
| Incumbent re-elected.
| nowrap | 

|-
! 
| Charles I. Faddis
|  | Democratic
| 1932
| Incumbent re-elected.
| nowrap | 

|-
! 
| J. Howard Swick
|  | Republican
| 1926
|  | Incumbent lost re-election.New member elected.Democratic gain.
| nowrap | 

|-
! 
| Nathan Leroy Strong
|  | Republican
| 1916
|  | Incumbent lost re-election.New member elected.Democratic gain.
| nowrap | 

|-
! 
| William M. Berlin
|  | Democratic
| 1932
| Incumbent re-elected.
| nowrap | 

|-
! 
| Charles N. Crosby
|  | Democratic
| 1932
| Incumbent re-elected.
| nowrap | 

|-
! 
| J. Twing Brooks
|  | Democratic
| 1932
| Incumbent re-elected.
| nowrap | 

|-
! 
| Melville Clyde Kelly
|  | Republican
| 1916
|  | Incumbent lost re-election.New member elected.Democratic gain.
| nowrap | 

|-
! 
| Michael J. Muldowney
|  | Republican
| 1932
|  | Incumbent lost re-election.New member elected.Democratic gain.
| nowrap | 

|-
! 
| Henry Ellenbogen
|  | Democratic
| 1932
| Incumbent re-elected.
| nowrap | 

|-
! 
| Matthew A. Dunn
|  | Democratic
| 1932
| Incumbent re-elected.
| nowrap | 

|}

Rhode Island 

|-
! 
| Francis Condon
|  | Democratic
| 1930
| Incumbent re-elected.
| nowrap | 

|-
! 
| John M. O'Connell
|  | Democratic
| 1932
| Incumbent re-elected.
| nowrap | 

|}

South Carolina 

|-
! 
| Thomas S. McMillan
|  | Democratic
| 1924
| Incumbent re-elected.
| nowrap | 

|-
! 
| Hampton P. Fulmer
|  | Democratic
| 1920
| Incumbent re-elected.
| nowrap | 

|-
! 
| John C. Taylor
|  | Democratic
| 1932
| Incumbent re-elected.
| nowrap | 

|-
! 
| John J. McSwain
|  | Democratic
| 1920
| Incumbent re-elected.
| nowrap | 

|-
! 
| James P. Richards
|  | Democratic
| 1932
| Incumbent re-elected.
| nowrap | 

|-
! 
| Allard H. Gasque
|  | Democratic
| 1922
| Incumbent re-elected.
| nowrap | 

|}

South Dakota 

|-
! 
| Fred H. Hildebrandt
|  | Democratic
| 1932
| Incumbent re-elected.
| nowrap | 

|-
! 
| Theodore B. Werner
|  | Democratic
| 1932
| Incumbent re-elected.
| nowrap | 

|}

Tennessee 

|-
! 
| B. Carroll Reece
|  | Republican
| 1932
| Incumbent re-elected.
| nowrap | 

|-
! 
| J. Will Taylor
|  | Republican
| 1918
| Incumbent re-elected.
| nowrap | 

|-
! 
| Sam D. McReynolds
|  | Democratic
| 1922
| Incumbent re-elected.
| nowrap | 

|-
! 
| John Ridley Mitchell
|  | Democratic
| 1930
| Incumbent re-elected.
| nowrap | 

|-
! 
| Joseph W. Byrns Sr.
|  | Democratic
| 1908
| Incumbent re-elected.
| nowrap | 

|-
! 
| Clarence W. Turner
|  | Democratic
| 1932
| Incumbent re-elected.
| nowrap | 

|-
! 
| Gordon Browning
|  | Democratic
| 1922
|  | Retired to run for U.S. senator.New member elected.Democratic hold.
| nowrap | 

|-
! 
| Jere Cooper
|  | Democratic
| 1928
| Incumbent re-elected.
| nowrap | 

|-
! 
| E. H. Crump
|  | Democratic
| 1930
|  | Incumbent retired.New member elected.Democratic hold.
| nowrap | 

|}

Texas 

|-
! 
| Wright Patman
|  | Democratic
| 1928
| Incumbent re-elected.
| nowrap | 

|-
! 
| Martin Dies Jr.
|  | Democratic
| 1930
| Incumbent re-elected.
| nowrap | 

|-
! 
| Morgan G. Sanders
|  | Democratic
| 1920
| Incumbent re-elected.
| nowrap | 

|-
! 
| Sam Rayburn
|  | Democratic
| 1912
| Incumbent re-elected.
| nowrap | 

|-
! 
| Hatton W. Sumners
|  | Democratic
| 1914
| Incumbent re-elected.
| nowrap | 

|-
! 
| Luther A. Johnson
|  | Democratic
| 1922
| Incumbent re-elected.
| nowrap | 

|-
! 
| Clark W. Thompson
|  | Democratic
| 1933 
|  | Incumbent retired.New member elected.Democratic hold.
| nowrap | 

|-
! 
| Joe H. Eagle
|  | Democratic
| 1933 
| Incumbent re-elected.
| nowrap | 

|-
! 
| Joseph J. Mansfield
|  | Democratic
| 1916
| Incumbent re-elected.
| nowrap | 

|-
! 
| James P. Buchanan
|  | Democratic
| 1912
| Incumbent re-elected.
| nowrap | 

|-
! 
| Oliver H. Cross
|  | Democratic
| 1928
| Incumbent re-elected.
| nowrap | 

|-
! 
| Fritz G. Lanham
|  | Democratic
| 1919 
| Incumbent re-elected.
| nowrap | 

|-
! 
| William D. McFarlane
|  | Democratic
| 1932
| Incumbent re-elected.
| nowrap | 

|-
! 
| Richard M. Kleberg
|  | Democratic
| 1931 
| Incumbent re-elected.
| nowrap | 

|-
! 
| Milton H. West
|  | Democratic
| 1933 
| Incumbent re-elected.
| nowrap | 

|-
! 
| R. Ewing Thomason
|  | Democratic
| 1930
| Incumbent re-elected.
| nowrap | 

|-
! 
| Thomas L. Blanton
|  | Democratic
| 1930
| Incumbent re-elected.
| nowrap | 

|-
! 
| John Marvin Jones
|  | Democratic
| 1916
| Incumbent re-elected.
| nowrap | 

|-
! 
| Joseph W. Bailey Jr.
|  | Democratic
| 1932
|  | Retired to run for U.S. senator.New member elected.Democratic hold.
| nowrap | 

|-
! 
| Sterling P. Strong
|  | Democratic
| 1932
|  | Incumbent lost renomination.New member elected.Democratic hold.
| nowrap | 

|-
! 
| George B. Terrell
|  | Democratic
| 1932
|  | Incumbent retired.New member elected.Democratic hold.
| nowrap | 

|}

Utah 

|-
! 
| Abe Murdock
|  | Democratic
| 1932
| Incumbent re-elected.
| nowrap | 

|-
! 
| J. W. Robinson
|  | Democratic
| 1932
| Incumbent re-elected.
| nowrap | 

|}

Vermont 

|-
! 
| Charles Albert Plumley
|  | Republican
| 1934 
| Incumbent re-elected.
| nowrap | 

|}

Virginia 

|-
! 
| S. Otis Bland
|  | Democratic
| 1918
| Incumbent re-elected.
| nowrap | 

|-
! 
| Colgate Darden
|  | Democratic
| 1932
| Incumbent re-elected.
| nowrap | 

|-
! 
| Andrew Jackson Montague
|  | Democratic
| 1912
| Incumbent re-elected.
| nowrap | 

|-
! 
| Patrick H. Drewry
|  | Democratic
| 1920
| Incumbent re-elected.
| nowrap | 

|-
! 
| Thomas G. Burch
|  | Democratic
| 1930
| Incumbent re-elected.
| nowrap | 

|-
! 
| Clifton A. Woodrum
|  | Democratic
| 1922
| Incumbent re-elected.
| nowrap | 

|-
! 
| Absalom Willis Robertson
|  | Democratic
| 1932
| Incumbent re-elected.
| nowrap | 

|-
! 
| Howard W. Smith
|  | Democratic
| 1930
| Incumbent re-elected.
| nowrap | 

|-
! 
| John W. Flannagan Jr.
|  | Democratic
| 1930
| Incumbent re-elected.
| nowrap | 

|}

Washington 

|-
! 
| Marion Zioncheck
|  | Democratic
| 1932
| Incumbent re-elected.
| nowrap | 

|-
! 
| Monrad C. Wallgren
|  | Democratic
| 1932
| Incumbent re-elected.
| nowrap | 

|-
! 
| Martin F. Smith
|  | Democratic
| 1932
| Incumbent re-elected.
| nowrap | 

|-
! 
| Knute Hill
|  | Democratic
| 1932
| Incumbent re-elected.
| nowrap | 

|-
! 
| Samuel B. Hill
|  | Democratic
| 1923 
| Incumbent re-elected.
| nowrap | 

|-
! 
| Wesley Lloyd
|  | Democratic
| 1932
| Incumbent re-elected.
| nowrap | 

|}

West Virginia 

|-
! 
| Robert L. Ramsay
|  | Democratic
| 1932
| Incumbent re-elected.
| nowrap | 

|-
! 
| Jennings Randolph
|  | Democratic
| 1932
| Incumbent re-elected.
| nowrap | 

|-
! 
| Andrew Edmiston Jr.
|  | Democratic
| 1933 
| Incumbent re-elected.
| nowrap | 

|-
! 
| George William Johnson
|  | Democratic
| 1932
| Incumbent re-elected.
| nowrap | 

|-
! 
| John Kee
|  | Democratic
| 1932
| Incumbent re-elected.
| nowrap | 

|-
! 
| Joe L. Smith
|  | Democratic
| 1928
| Incumbent re-elected.
| nowrap | 

|}

Wisconsin 

|-
! 
| George Washington Blanchard
|  | Republican
| 1932
|  | Incumbent retired.New member elected.Progressive gain.
| nowrap | 

|-
! 
| Charles W. Henney
|  | Democratic
| 1932
|  | Incumbent lost re-election.New member elected.Progressive gain.
| nowrap | 

|-
! 
| Gardner R. Withrow
|  | Republican
| 1920
|  | Re-elected as ProgressiveProgressive gain.
| nowrap | 

|-
! 
| Raymond Joseph Cannon
|  | Democratic
| 1932
| Incumbent re-elected.
| nowrap | 

|-
! 
| Thomas O'Malley
|  | Democratic
| 1932
| Incumbent re-elected.
| nowrap | 

|-
! 
| Michael Reilly
|  | Democratic
| 1930
| Incumbent re-elected.
| nowrap | 

|-
! 
| Gerald J. Boileau
|  | Republican
| 1930
|  | Re-elected as ProgressiveProgressive gain.
| nowrap | 

|-
! 
| James F. Hughes
|  | Democratic
| 1932
|  | Incumbent retired.New member elected.Progressive gain.
| nowrap | 

|-
! 
| James A. Frear
|  | Republican
| 1912
|  | Incumbent retired.New member elected.Progressive gain.
| nowrap | 

|-
! 
| Hubert H. Peavey
|  | Republican
| 1922
|  | Incumbent lost re-election.New member elected.Progressive gain.
| nowrap | 

|}

Wyoming 

|-
! 
| Vincent Carter
|  | Republican
| 1928
|  | Retired to run for U.S. senator.New member elected.Democratic gain.
| nowrap | 

|}

Non-voting delegates

Alaska Territory 

|-
! 
| Anthony Dimond
|  | Democratic
| 1932
| Incumbent re-elected.
| nowrap | 

|}

Philippines 

|-
! 
| Pedro Guevara
|  | Nacionalista
| 1922
| Incumbent re-elected.
| nowrap | 

|}

See also
 1934 United States elections
 1934 United States gubernatorial elections
1934 United States Senate elections
 73rd United States Congress
 74th United States Congress

Notes

References